Loha Singh is Bhojpuri film released in 1966 directed by Kundan Kumar. This film was based on a play named Loha Singh written by Rameshwar Singh Kashyap.

See also 
 Bhojpuri cinema
 List of Bhojpuri films

References

External links

1960s Bhojpuri-language films
1966 films